The Shapo Reservoir is located 5 km south of Haikou city, Hainan, China, south of Shapo Village at Chengxi Town. The purpose of this reservoir is to prevent floods and conserve water to supply to Haikou. It is roughly 2 km long. A single dam is located at the northeast bank.

Water released from this dam flows into a spillway and then starts the Meishe River. This narrow river then flows eastward under Longkun Road just south of the Haikou East Railway Station. It then turns north, runs past the Meishe River National Wetland Park, and empties into the Haidian River.

Design and construction
The Shapo Reservoir was designed and is administered within Longhua District's jurisdiction.

Construction of the reservoir started in 1959 and was completed in 1964. Reinforcements were made in 2013.

Description

The reservoir

Shapo is a medium-size reservoir being 27.46 km2. It can hold 14,190,000 cubic metres of water. The normal water level is 30 metres, and at that level, it contains 11,320,000 cubic metres of water. With the exception of the concrete dam, its banks are entirely natural and mostly tree-lined.

The dam

On the northeast bank there is roughly 300-metre-long dam. It has two outlets, a set of three floodgates at its south end, and a small outlet at the north end. Water from the north outlet follows a narrow, concrete channel that empties into the Meishe River. Water from the main floodgates also runs into the same river after flowing down a banked spillway.

On top of the dam there is a narrow road for vehicular traffic.

Usage
The primary purpose of the reservoir is for water storage and flood prevention. Fishing and boating is prohibited. However, some fishermen are able to circumvent or defeat fences and are found fishing along the banks.

Gallery

References

External links

Reservoirs in China
Bodies of water of Hainan